Addington is a small town in Victoria, Australia. It is located at the junction of Langi Kal-Kal Road and Edmonston Road, about 28 kilometres north-west of Ballarat.

The town began as an agricultural settlement around Addington Railway Station. A state school opened in 1860 under the name Ercildoune, and the area was known to the postal service as Mount Bolton. The school changed its name to Addington circa 1900.
The Post Office opened on 1 May 1858 as Mount Bolton, was renamed Addington in 1892 and closed in 1967.

References

External links

Towns in Victoria (Australia)